Joel Rodríguez Pérez (born 6 October 1997) is a Spanish sailor. In 2017 he won the Laser Junior World Championships. He competed at the 2020 Summer Olympics in the Laser class.

Notes

References

External links
 
 
 
 

1997 births
Living people
Spanish male sailors (sport)
Olympic sailors of Spain
Sailors at the 2020 Summer Olympics – Laser
Mediterranean Games medalists in sailing
Mediterranean Games silver medalists for Spain
Mediterranean Games bronze medalists for Spain
Competitors at the 2018 Mediterranean Games
Competitors at the 2022 Mediterranean Games
Sportspeople from Las Palmas
20th-century Spanish people
21st-century Spanish people